William  Park (23 February 1919 – 19 July 2016) was an English professional footballer who played as a half-back in the Football League for Blackpool and York City, and in non-League football for Felling Red Star and Scarborough.

References
Specific

General
Gerry Wolstenholme's obituary for Billy Park, 1 August 2016

1919 births
Footballers from Gateshead
2016 deaths
English footballers
Association football midfielders
Blackpool F.C. players
York City F.C. players
Scarborough F.C. players
English Football League players